This is a list of the chapters of the manga series Jigoku Sensei Nūbē by the duo of artist Takeshi Okano and writer Shō Makura, published in the manga anthology Weekly Shōnen Jump .



Volume list

Bunko Volumes
In 2006, Shueisha released the entire series in new volumes, filled with more chapters per volume than the original 31 volume run and new material by Takeshi Okano.

References

Hell Teacher Nūbē
Jigoku Sensei Nube